The Philadelphia Cricket Club, founded in 1854, is the oldest country club in the United States. It has two locations: Chestnut Hill, Philadelphia, and Flourtown, Pennsylvania.

History

Founded on February 10, 1854, the Philadelphia Cricket Club is the oldest country club in the United States. As the name indicates, the Club was formed by a group of young men of English ancestry who had played the game of cricket as students at the University of Pennsylvania. With the wish to continue to play together after their graduation, they formed the club under the leadership of William Rotch Wister.

For the first 30 years of the club's existence, the club did not own any grounds and thus played cricket on any grounds available, such as at Camden, New Jersey. Then, in 1883, the club “came home” to Chestnut Hill due to the generosity of a benefactor, Henry H. Houston. Houston arranged for them to settle down at the club's present location on West Willow Grove Avenue in the St. Martins section of Chestnut Hill.

Location
The Philadelphia Cricket Club has two locations. The original location in Chestnut Hill, Philadelphia where the main offices are located, along with the tennis courts, squash facilities, an eight-lane twenty-five meter swimming pool, and a short nine-hole golf course. The second location is ten minutes away in Whitemarsh Township, near Flourtown, which holds two 18-hole golf courses.

Sports

Golf
When the Golf Association of Philadelphia was organized in 1897, the club was one of four founding members with Merion, Philadelphia Country Club and Aronimink. Both the Wissahickon and Militia Hill courses have been recognized for their outstanding layouts and course conditions over the years. (Wissahickon has been named a top-100 classic course multiple times and Militia Hill a top-25 golf course in Pennsylvania).

St. Martins Course 

The original nine-hole course was built in 1895 by famed architect Willie Tucker (St. Andrew's Golf Club, Sand Point Country Club and Argyle Country Club) and was quickly replaced by a new eighteen-hole course in 1897. The old eighteen-hole course, known as St. Martins and now playing as a nine-hole layout, hosted the United States Open Championship in 1907 and 1910. The 1907 winner was Alec Ross, brother of famed architect Donald Ross, who chalked up a remarkable score of 302 for 72 holes. It was also during this championship that the first hole-in-one in U.S. Open competition was achieved by Jack Hobens. The 1910 Open victory went to Alex Smith, who shot 71 on the final day. Also entered that year was Cricket Club's own professional, Scottish-born Willie Anderson, one of four golfers who have won the U.S. Open four times. Anderson remains the only person to win in three consecutive years. This course is named "St. Martins" after the adjacent episcopal church, St. Martin-in-the-Fields. In 2015 the St Martins course was sold to the club by the Woodward Family as part of an open space initiative. Hosted the World Hickory Championship in 2016 & the National Hickory Championship in 2017 on the St Martins course.

U.S. Open Champions and Scores

Course Scorecard

Wissahickon Course 
A large tract of land was purchased in 1920, because the Club did not own the grounds on which the St. Martins golf course was built. It was A. W. Tillinghast (Bethpage – Black, Baltusrol, Newport, San Francisco and Winged Foot) who recommended the Flourtown site and who designed the new course, which opened in 1922.  The Wissahickon course is one of the few remaining courses designed by Tillinghast that has had minimal changes over the past 80 years. The name "Wissahickon" comes from the Lenape word for "Catfish Stream." The Wissahickon Creek runs adjacent to the course. Lorraine Run, which eventually dumps into the Wissahickon Creek, runs through the Wissahickon course. An abandoned Reading Railroad track runs through the course, along the 6th and 11th holes.

On June 18, 2013, construction was started on a complete restoration of the Wissahickon course, led by designer Keith Foster and Director of Grounds Dan Meersman.

Since the completion of the 2014 renovation, "Wissahickon" has hosted the 2014 Philadelphia Open, the 2015 PGA Professional National Championship (With Militia Hill), the 2016 Constellation Senior Players Championship, and will host the 2024 U.S. Amateur Four-Ball (originally scheduled for 2020, but deferred to 2024 by the USGA after cancellation). The course is dedicated to A.W. Tillinghast, who was a long-time member of the Philadelphia Cricket Club and a native of Philadelphia.

Course Scorecard

Militia Hill Course 
In 1999, the Board of Governors made a decision to begin the development of a third golf course located on land acquired in the original purchase of the Flourtown property nearly eighty years before. After submissions by several top designers, the Club selected Michael Hurdzan and Dana Fry, who had already designed a number of highly rated courses throughout the United States and Canada (Erin Hills, Calusa Pines, Hamilton Farms and Naples National). The Club named the new course ‘Militia Hill’ in honor of the adjacent Militia Hill section of Fort Washington State Park, which had been occupied during the American Revolution by the Pennsylvania Militia just before moving on to their legendary winter encampment at Valley Forge. Like the Wissahickon course, a train track runs through the middle of the golf course. Although this line is active, and golfers pass through a tunnel (which was constructed well before the golf course) twice each round. The course is dedicated to Willie Anderson, a member of the World Golf Hall of Fame, who at one point, early in the 20th century, was the head golf professional at the club.

Course Scorecard

Cricket 
The cricket team was initially disbanded in 1924 but was later revived in 1998. The club is now one of the hosts of the annual Philadelphia International Cricket Festival.

Squash

Eight singles courts and two hardball doubles courts round out PCC's squash program. Rich Wade is the director of squash. PCC has coached many national champions and countless players who went on to play intercollegiate squash.

Swimming
In 2019 PCC won the Country Club Swim Association of Greater Philadelphia League Championship.

In 2006 the swimming team placed fourth at the Country Club Swimming Association of Greater Philadelphia's League Championships led by the William Penn Charter's high school swimming coach Kevin Berkoff.

Tennis – Lawn, Pickleball, & Platform

In 1881, the club was one of the founding members of the United States Lawn Tennis Association, today the USTA. The club hosted the inaugural U.S. Women's National Singles Championship in 1887, and continued to host the event until 1921, when it moved to Forest Hills. The Women's National Doubles Championship (which started in 1889) and Mixed Doubles Championship (which started in 1892) were also held at the club until 1921. These events later combined with the men's singles and doubles championships to form the U.S. Open.

Annually, the club hosts the USTA 30-35 and 70s age group championships.

The club operates 18 rotating grass courts, nine HydroClay courts, and two indoor hard courts.

Platform Tennis 
In 2014, the platform tennis hut was listed as one of the most impressive by Town & Country. The club hosted the 2017 Philly Cricket Invitational for American Platform Tennis Association finals and was one of the National Championship hosts.

The club has 4 permanent platform tennis courts.

Pickleball 
Pickleball became a prominent sport at PCC in 2019. Constructing six outdoor courts and eight temporary indoor courts on the indoor tennis courts.

Trapshooting
Due to the extensive efforts in recent years of the Trapshooting Committee, trapshooting has become a thriving sport at PCC. Competitions are held November through April at clubs around the Philadelphia region.

See also

Philadelphian cricket team
Merion Cricket Club
Germantown Cricket Club
Belmont Cricket Club

References

External links
Philadelphia Cricket Club
History of Chestnut Hill Academy, which is across the street and shares some history

American club cricket teams
Golf clubs and courses in Pennsylvania
Golf clubs and courses designed by A. W. Tillinghast
Golf clubs and courses designed by Michael Hurdzan
History of tennis
Buildings and structures in Montgomery County, Pennsylvania
Tennis venues in Pennsylvania
Cricket clubs established in 1854
Sports in Philadelphia
Athletics clubs in the United States
1854 establishments in Pennsylvania
History of Philadelphia
Chestnut Hill, Philadelphia
Clubs and societies in Philadelphia
Cricket in Philadelphia